Nuneaton is a market town in the borough of Nuneaton and Bedworth in northern Warwickshire, England, close to the county border with Leicestershire and West Midlands County.  Nuneaton's population at the 2021 census was 94,634, an increase from 86,552 at the 2011 census making it the largest town in Warwickshire.

Originally a small riverside settlement known as Etone, Nuneaton gained its name from a medieval nunnery which was established in the 12th century, during which it also became a small market town. It later developed into an important industrial town due to ribbon weaving and coal mining. 

The author George Eliot was born on a farm on the Arbury Estate just outside Nuneaton in 1819 and lived in the town for much of her early life. Her novel Scenes of Clerical Life (1858) depicts Nuneaton. There is a hospital named after her, The George Eliot Hospital. There is also a statue of George Eliot in the town centre.

History

Early history

Nuneaton was originally an Anglo-Saxon settlement known as 'Etone' or 'Eaton', which translates literally as 'settlement by water', referring to the River Anker. 'Etone' was listed in the Domesday Book as a small farming settlement with a population of around 150. In the early 12th century, the settlement came under the control of the Beaumont family, and in around 1155 Robert de Beaumont granted his manor of Etone to the French Abbey of Fontevraud, who established a Benedictine nunnery here, which became known as Nuneaton Priory. This led to Etone becoming known as Nuneaton. The nunnery was closed in 1539 during King Henry VIII's Dissolution of the Monasteries, and subsequently fell into ruin. However part of the Abbey church was rebuilt in the 19th and early 20th century.

Nuneaton obtained a market charter in around 1160 from Henry II which was reconfirmed in 1226, causing Nuneaton to develop into a market town and become the economic focal point of the local villages.

King Edward VI School was established in 1552 by a royal charter by King Edward VI. The school was originally a fee-paying school, although the county council provided some scholarships, and became non-fee paying as a result of the education act of 1944. The voluntary aided school had around 400 boys in the 1960s. In 1974 the grammar school closed and was re-established as a sixth form college.

In 1543, Nuneaton was recorded as containing 169 houses, with a population of around 800, by 1670 this had grown to 415 households, with a population of 1,867, by 1740 this had risen further to 2,480.

The growth of industry

Ribbon weaving
In the mid-17th century, a silk ribbon weaving industry became established in the local area which included Nuneaton, Bedworth, Coventry and much of North Warwickshire. This industry was enhanced by the arrival of French Huguenot immigrants in the latter part of the century, who brought with them new techniques. This industry operated as a cottage industry, with the weavers working from top-shops; a type of building which was specific to the local area, and had living space in the two lower floors, and a workshop with very large windows on the top floor. This industry flourished for nearly two centuries, albeit with periodic booms and slumps. However, by the early 19th century the industry was struggling to compete against the factory produced textiles from northern manufacturers, and the local weavers strongly resisted adopting factory production methods as they valued their independence. Nevertheless, in 1851 46% of Nuneaton's workforce was still employed by the ribbon trade. The industry was finally wiped out after 1860 by cheap imports, following the Cobden–Chevalier Treaty, which removed duties on imported French silks. This caused a slump in the local economy which lasted nearly two decades.

Coal mining
Another major industry which grew in the local area was coal mining: as Nuneaton was located in the Warwickshire coalfield, mining was recorded locally as early as 1338, however the lack of efficient transport and primitive mining techniques kept the industry on a small scale. The industry did not start to develop on a larger scale until the 17th century, with the dawn of the industrial revolution, which led to greater demand for fuel and technical advancement. A major problem was the drainage of water from coal pits as they were dug deeper. The use of a waterwheel to drive drainage pumps was recorded as early as 1683. The first recorded use of an atmospheric engine; a primitive form of steam engine to pump water from coal pits was recorded at Griff Colliery in 1714, this was the first recorded use of a steam engine in Warwickshire. Nevertheless, another major problem facing the industry was poor transport. Sir Roger Newdigate who owned several local coal mines developed a turnpike road to Coventry in the 1750s, which partially resolved this problem. Early on Newdigate recognised the potential of canals as a means for transporting bulk cargoes. He developed a system of private canals on his land on the Arbury Estate from 1764 to transport coal and helped promote the Coventry Canal, which opened from Coventry to Nuneaton in 1769, before being finally completed to Staffordshire in 1790. he also helped promote the Oxford Canal. Ironically, the new canal system led to a decline in the Warwickshire coal industry after 1800, as it was exploited by Staffordshire coal producers to capture the local market. It would not be until the development of the railway network in the 19th century that the coal industry would be exploited to its maximum potential.

The first railway to reach Nuneaton was the Trent Valley Railway which opened in 1847, linking Nuneaton to the growing national railway network at Rugby and Stafford. This was followed by a branch line to Coventry in 1850. In 1864 a line was opened from Birmingham to Leicester via Nuneaton, and this proved to be the most important for the local economy, as it linked Nuneaton with the rapidly growing town (later city) of Birmingham. Due largely to this, the local coal industry expanded rapidly in the latter half of the 19th century, with production from the Warwickshire coalfield expanding nearly tenfold between 1860 and 1913 from around 545,000 tons to over five million tons. The industry peaked in the early 20th century; in 1911 one third of the male workforce in Nuneaton were employed as miners. The industry, however, declined rapidly in the 1950s and 1960s, with the last coal mine in Nuneaton closing in 1968, although Newdigate colliery at Bedworth lasted until 1982. The last Warwickshire coal mine at nearby Daw Mill closed in 2013.

Other industries
Nuneaton underwent a period of rapid growth from the 1880s onwards with the rapid development of an array of industries. These included brick and tile making, brewing, the production of hats and leather goods. and engineering. At the time of the first national census in 1801 Nuneaton was one of the largest towns in Warwickshire, with a population of 5,135. By 1901 this had grown to 24,996.

Civic history
A local board of health had been set up in Nuneaton in 1848 to provide the town with necessary infrastructure such as paved roads, clean drinking water, street lighting and sewerage. The old parish of Nuneaton included the settlements of Attleborough and Stockingford. The parish was joined with Chilvers Coton parish in 1894 to form an urban district. Nuneaton was upgraded to the status of a municipal borough in 1907, to which the parishes of Weddington and part of Caldecote were added in 1931. In 1974, the Municipal Borough of Nuneaton was merged with Bedworth Urban District to create the Borough of Nuneaton and Bedworth.

Second World War
Nuneaton suffered severe bomb damage during The Blitz in the Second World War between 1940 and 1942. The heaviest bombing raid on Nuneaton took place on 17 May 1941, when 130 people were killed, 380 houses were destroyed, and over 10,000 damaged.

Postwar to present
In 1947 the architect and town planner Frederick Gibberd was appointed to create a masterplan to redevelop the bomb damaged town centre. The redevelopment, which continued until the 1960s included the features typical of town planning from that era, including a new ringroad, indoor shopping centre, administrative centre and library.

Nuneaton continued to expand in the latter 20th century. In the early postwar years the need arose for low-cost housing, and in response to this around 2,500 council houses were built during the 1950s, the largest such development was at Camp Hill, where 1,400 new houses were built by 1956, while around 1,100 new council houses were built at new estates at Hill Top, Caldwell and Marston Lane by 1958. Following this, Nuneaton's expansion was largely driven by private developments at Weddington, St Nicolas Park, Whitestone and Stockingford.

Historic population

Geography

The River Anker runs through the town. Nuneaton town centre was historically prone to regular flooding from the Anker, with especially bad floods in 1932 and 1968. This was relieved in 1976 by the construction of a flood relief channel.

Nuneaton forms the largest part of the Nuneaton built-up area which also includes the large villages of Hartshill and Bulkington. It had a population of 132,236 at the 2001 Census. In the 2011 Census it had a considerably lower population of 92,698 because Hinckley ceased to be defined as part of the urban area. On 19 July 2022, it recorded its highest ever temperature of 38 °C during the 2022 United Kingdom heat wave.

Towns close to Nuneaton include Bedworth, Atherstone and Hinckley, with Tamworth, Rugby, Coleshill and Lutterworth a little further afield.

Districts and suburbs of Nuneaton

Within the borough boundaries:
 Abbey Green
 Arbury
 Attleborough (including Maple Park)
 Bermuda
 Caldwell
 Camp Hill
 Chapel End (including The Shires)
 Chilvers Coton
 Galley Common
 Griff
 Grove Farm
 Heath End
 Hill Top
 Horeston Grange
 Robinson's End
 St Nicolas Park
 Stockingford (including Glendale, Sunnyside, Black-a-Tree, Church Farm)
 Weddington
 Whitestone (including Crowhill)
 Whittleford (including Poplar Farm, Hawthorn Common)
Adjacent or adjoining places, some of which fall outside the borough boundaries:
 Ansley
 Bulkington
 Caldecote
 Hartshill

Politics

National

Nuneaton is part of the constituency of the same name in the House of Commons. The constituency is currently represented by the Conservative Party Member of Parliament (MP), Marcus Jones, who was first elected in the 2010 general election. From 1935 to 1983, Nuneaton was a safe Labour seat, but it has become more marginal. Between 1983 and 1992, the Conservatives held the seat, until losing it back to Labour. For the next 18 years, the Labour Party (in the form of Bill Olner) was the local representative at Parliament, until his retirement.

Local

There are two-tiers of local government covering Nuneaton; Nuneaton and Bedworth Borough Council as the lower tier and Warwickshire County Council as the upper tier. Nuneaton is an unparished area and so there is no tier of administration below the Borough council. Nuneaton and Bedworth council was once solidly controlled by the Labour Party, but has in more recent years become more changeable: It was Labour controlled from its creation in 1974, until the 2008 local elections, when the Conservatives gained control, ending 34 years of Labour rule. (Further reading: 2008 Nuneaton and Bedworth Borough Council election) However, the period of Conservative control was relatively short lived. The Labour Party won two seats from the Conservative Party in the 2010 local elections, giving no party overall control of the council (but leaving the Labour Party as the largest grouping). In 2012 Labour gained a further 8 seats to regain overall control which they lost again to no overall control in 2018. In the May 2021 elections, the Conservatives once more gained a majority; winning ten seats from Labour and one from an independent.

Economy

Nuneaton's traditional industries like textiles, mining and manufacturing have declined significantly in the post-war years. Due to its transport links, Nuneaton is to some extent a commuter town for nearby Coventry and Birmingham. However a relatively large number of businesses involved in the automotive, aerospace and engineering supply chains industries are active in the area. MIRA Limited, formerly the Motor Industry Research Association, is based on a disused wartime airfield on the A5, to the north of the town.

One of the biggest developments in the town's history, the multimillion-pound Ropewalk Shopping Centre, opened in September 2005 in the hope that it will give the town extra income from the shopping, attract more visitors and retailers, and attract shoppers as an alternative to larger retail centres such as Birmingham, Coventry, Leicester and Solihull. An older shopping centre, the Abbeygate Shopping Centre in the town centre was first opened in the 1960s, and was formerly known as Heron Way.

The European headquarters of Holland & Barrett are based in the town, as is the UK head office of FedEx. While Bermuda Park, which is south of Nuneaton, is the location of the national distribution centres of Dairy Crest and RS Components. Nuneaton is also the location of several international online marketing companies.

In 2017 the Nuneaton and Bedworth borough was less prosperous than the rest of Warwickshire, reflecting the long established north–south divide in the county. The average annual workplace wage in Nuneaton and Bedworth was £21,981, the lowest in the county and below the Warwickshire average of £28,513 (and UK £28,296) although the productivity gap had narrowed with the rest of Warwickshire since 2009.

Religion

Nuneaton's name reflects the effect that Christianity has had upon the town's history. Although the Benedictine nunnery which gave the town its name was destroyed at the time of the Reformation, the remaining fragments were incorporated into the Anglican church building now known as the Abbey Church of St Mary the Virgin in Manor Court Road. This is a Victorian construction.

Church of England
Near the town centre, but unusually not a part of it and outside the ring road, lies the medieval church of St. Nicolas – a grade I listed building. Chilvers Coton contains All Saints' Church, where Mary Ann Evans (George Eliot) worshipped and Justin Welby, now Archbishop of Canterbury, served as a curate. This was badly damaged by bombing during the Second World War, and rebuilt largely by German prisoners of war. There are also Anglican churches in Weddington (St James's), Attleborough (Holy Trinity), Stockingford (St Paul's), Galley Common (St Peter's), Abbey Green (St Mary's), and more recently built (1954), in Camp Hill St Mary's and St John's.

Roman Catholic Church
There are two parishes in the town serving the Catholic community in Nuneaton. Our Lady of the Angels on Coton Road, was opened in 1838 (originally as St Mary's). The building, designed by Joseph Hansom, was extensively remodeled in 1936. The Parish of St Anne's, Chapel End, Nuneaton was created in 1949 out of the Parish of Our Lady of the Angels (which originally covered the whole town). The original church building was replaced with the existing church, which was opened in 2000.

Other Christian traditions
In the town, Baptist, Methodist, Wesleyan Reform Union, the Church of Jesus Christ of Latter-day Saints, Pentecostal, the Salvation Army, United Reformed and Christadelphian churches serve their respective congregations.

A Kingdom Hall of Jehovah's Witnesses is located in the Stockingford area and Christadelphians in Whitestone.

Other world religions
In addition to Christianity, there are also followers of Islam, Sikhism and Hinduism. There is a mosque on Frank Street, Chilvers Coton and two gurdwaras (Sikh temples): the Nuneaton Guru Nanak Gurdwara in Park Avenue, Attleborough, and the Shri Guru Tegh Bahadur Gurdwara in Marlborough Road, Chilvers Coton.

A number of Jewish families have settled in and around Nuneaton over the past two centuries as local industries have grown and ebbed. Historically, families would travel for important life events and holidays to worship at the mediaeval Spon Street Synagogue in Coventry, at the short lived Hinckley Synagogue in the early 20th century and most recently, in the modern Coventry Reform Synagogue.

The Bahá'i Faith has been represented in Nuneaton and Bedworth since 1980 and the first Local Spiritual Assembly was formed in April 1982. The growing Bahá'i community has been supportive of educational and social issues, has encouraged multi faith events and organised 'Live Unity' concerts in Riversley Park and the BBC award-winning 'Walk of Faith', which visited the main religious venues listed above to promote a sense of the unity of religions.

Demographics
At the 2011 census there were 86,552 residents in Nuneaton in 37,317 households. The median age of Nuneaton residents was 39.

In terms of ethnicity:

91.6% of Nuneaton residents were White (Comprising 89.3% White British, 1.8% Other White, 0.5% Irish and 0.1% Gypsy/Irish Traveller). 
6.2% were Asian (Comprising 4.4% Indian, 0.5% Pakistani, 0.2% Chinese and 1.1% from another Asian background)
0.8% were Black (Comprising 0.4% African, 0.3% Caribbean and 0.1% other Black)
1.1% were Mixed. 
0.1% were Arab and 0.2% were from another ethnic group.

In terms of religion, 63.5% of Nuneaton residents identified as Christian, 24.3% said they had no religion, 6.0% did not state any religion, 3.1% were Muslim, 1.2% were Hindu, 1.2% were Sikh, 0.4% were Buddhists, and 0.4% were from another religion.

Transport

Road
The town is near the M6, the M42 and M69 motorways and the main A5 trunk road (Watling Street), which also acts as a border with Leicestershire and the neighbouring town of Hinckley. The A444 provides a high-speed dual-carriageway route into the town from the south and also acts as the often busy town centre ring road. The A47 links the town with neighbouring Hinckley and onwards to Leicester, and the A4254 – Eastern Relief Road – provides direct access from the east of Nuneaton to the south, avoiding the town centre.

Railway

The town has two railway stations. The main Nuneaton railway station, located near the town centre, is an important railway junction and is served by the West Coast Main Line running from London to the North West, the cross-country Birmingham to Peterborough Line and by a line to Coventry via Bedworth. A new railway station at Bermuda Park was opened south of the town centre in 2016 on the line towards Coventry, as part of the NUCKLE (Nuneaton, Coventry, Kenilworth and Leamington) rail upgrade scheme.

Historically, Nuneaton was also served by Chilvers Coton station, Abbey Street station and Stockingford station. Chilvers Coton station was located on the Coventry line, a short distance north of the new Bermuda Park station, and was closed in 1965. Abbey Street station and Stockingford station were on the line towards Birmingham and were both closed in 1968. In January 2017, there were proposals to open a new station at Stockingford, at a different location from the former one, which could open by 2023. Warwickshire County Council have also proposed a new Nuneaton Parkway station between Nuneaton and Hinckley, which could open by 2034.

Bus
The principal operator around Nuneaton is Stagecoach in Warwickshire and the depot is located next to the fire station on Newtown Road, just west from the bus station. Arriva Midlands also operate a number of routes around Nuneaton with buses running to Tamworth, Hinckley, Barwell, Leicester. MIRA, and Coventry.  Arriva Midlands also operate service 78 to Walsgrave Hospital, a service operated by Travel de Courcey until the company entered administration in 2020.

In January 2020 NX Coventry announced an extension to Nuneaton on their 20 route from Coventry to Bedworth.

Canal
The Coventry Canal passes through Nuneaton, while the Ashby Canal skirts the town's south-eastern outskirts.

Recreation and culture

Nuneaton has two non-league football teams: Nuneaton Borough who play in the National League North and Nuneaton Griff who play in the Midland Football League Division One. Sunday League football is played in the town, with teams from Nuneaton, Bedworth and North Warwickshire competing in the Nuneaton & District Sunday Football League (NDSFL).

There are three rugby union clubs: Nuneaton R.F.C. (nicknamed "the Nuns"), who play in National 3 Midlands, Nuneaton Old Edwardians of Midlands 2 West (South) division and Manor Park of the Midlands 3 West (South) league.

The town is also the location of Nuneaton Bowling club, where flat green bowls is played.

There are three main leisure centres in the town owned by Nuneaton and Bedworth Borough Council and managed by Everyone Active on the council's behalf (after a competitive tender process):
Pingles Leisure Centre – The Pingles is the main leisure centre in Nuneaton. It was rebuilt in 2004 to replace the original Pingles that was built in 1965. The new Pingles includes an indoor and outdoor swimming areas, a dance studio and gym. 
The Pingles Stadium – The Pingles Stadium was built in 1998. It has a 4,000 capacity with a 250-seater stand, athletics track, and football pitch. The stadium is home to Nuneaton Harriers Athletic Club, Nuneaton Griff Football Club and Nuneaton Triathlon Club.
Jubilee Sports Centre – The Jubilee Sports Centre is a sports hall. The hall is used for various sports including badminton, five-a-side football/indoor football and basketball. The Jubilee also has a scoreboard, used for major basketball and indoor football matches. The hall can be hired out for uses such as karate lessons.
Etone Sports Centre – Etone Sports Centre is another sports hall. Etone sports hall also has astroturf football pitches which are used also for hockey. The centre is in the grounds of the school which bears the same name, Etone School, but 'Everyone Active' maintains the building.

Nuneaton has a museum and art gallery in the grounds of Riversley Park adjacent to the town centre. The museum includes a display on George Eliot. Eliot's family home Griff House is now a restaurant and hotel on the A444.

The Abbey Theatre is Nuneaton's only theatre and hosts a wide variety of performances including visiting opera and ballet companies, touring shows, musicals, pantomime and drama. Run solely by volunteers, the Abbey Theatre seats 250 plus space for wheelchair patrons.

Nuneaton annually enters the Britain in Bloom competition and in 2000, Nuneaton and Bedworth was a national finalist. It is the location of Nuneaton Carnival, the largest carnival in Warwickshire, which takes place every June.

Nuneaton was home to the smallest independent newspaper in Britain (the Heartland Evening News) until it was purchased in 2006 by life News & Media.

Public art in Nuneaton includes a statue of George Eliot on Newdegate Square, and the Gold Belt.

George Eliot's inspirations

Many locations in George Eliot's works were based on places in or near her native Nuneaton, including:
Milby (town and parish church, based on Nuneaton and St Nicolas parish church);
Shepperton (based on Chilvers Coton);
Paddiford Common (based on Stockingford, which at the time had a large area of common land including its parish Church of St Paul's);
Knebley (based on Astley; Knebley Church is Astley Church, while Knebley Abbey is Astley Castle);
Red Deeps (based on Griff Hollows);
Cheverel Manor (based on Arbury Hall);
Dorlcote Mill (based on Griff House);
The Red Lion (based on the Bull Hotel, now the George Eliot Hotel in Bridge Street, Nuneaton);
Middlemarch (based on Coventry);
Treby Magna (also thought to be based on Coventry);
Little Treby (thought to be based on Stoneleigh);
Transome Court (thought to be based on Stoneleigh Abbey).

Landmarks
It is also known locally as the Nuneaton Nipple. In May 2018 it was voted the best UK landmark in an online poll for the Daily Mirror newspaper, beating competition from the likes of the Angel of the North and Big Ben.

Another well known landmark is the Roanne Fountain, also known as the Dandelion Fountain, which sits in the middle of a roundabout in the town centre, it was built in 2000, and features 385 spraying arms which spray out 50,000 gallons of water per hour. In 2016 it was voted the 'UK Roundabout of the Year' by the Roundabout Appreciation Society, who stated that the town should feel "very proud for achieving such a high roundabout accolade."

Education

Primary

Abbey CE Infant School, Abbey Green
All Saints' CE Primary School, Hill Top
Camp Hill Primary School, Camp Hill
Chetwynd Junior School, Whitestone
Chilvers Coton Community Infant School, Chilvers Coton
Croft Junior School, Stockingford
Galley Common Infant School, Galley Common
Glendale Infant School, Heath End
Lower Farm Academy, Weddington
Michael Drayton Junior School, Hartshill
Middlemarch Junior School, Hill Top
Milby Primary School, St Nicolas Park
Milverton House School, Attleborough
Nathaniel Newton Infant School, Hartshill
Nursery Hill Primary School, Ansley Common
Oak Wood Primary School (special school), Hill Top
Our Lady & St Joseph Catholic Academy, Attleborough
Park Lane Primary School, Grove Farm
Queen's CE Junior School, Chilvers Coton
St Anne's Catholic Primary School, Camp Hill
St Nicolas' CE Primary School, St Nicolas Park
St Paul's CE Primary School, Stockingford
Stockingford Primary Academy, Stockingford
Weddington Primary School, Weddington
Wembrook Primary School, Attleborough
Whitestone Infant School, Whitestone

Secondary
Etone College, Horeston Grange
George Eliot Academy, Hill Top
Hartshill Academy Hartshill
Higham Lane School, Weddington
Nuneaton Academy, resulting from the merger of Alderman Smith School and Manor Park School), Stockingford
Oak Wood Secondary School (special school), Hill Top
St Thomas More Catholic School, Heath End

Further education
King Edward VI College, Attleborough
North Warwickshire and Hinckley College, St Nicolas Park
St Thomas More R.C. Sixth Form College, Heath End
Etone Sixth Form College, Horeston Grange
Higham Lane Sixth Form College, Weddington

Notable people

Literature
 George Eliot (1819–1880), Victorian novelist
 A. J. Quinnell (1940–2005), English thriller novelist

Science and technology
 John Barber (1734–1793), inventor of the gas turbine in 1791
 John Birch (1867–1945), motorcycle manufacturer and designer
 Richard K. Guy (1916–2020), British mathematician and author
  Henry Beighton ( 1687–1743). Engineer, cartographer and engraver.

Media and the arts

 Paul Bradley, (born 1955) actor (born in Nuneaton)
 Ben Daniels, (born 1964) actor (born in Nuneaton)
 Gareth Edwards, (born 1975) film director, Monsters, Godzilla and the 2016 Star Wars standalone film, Rogue One.
 Chris Emmett, (born 1938) comedian, notably appearing on 3-2-1
 Eyeless In Gaza, post-punk duo, formed 1980
 Fresh Maggots, early 1970s folk/psychedelic rock group
 Larry Grayson, (1923–1995) comedian, entertainer and television presenter, long-term resident of Nuneaton.
 Alan and Graham "Kidder" Hammonds, musicians, Incredible Kidda Band (grew up in Nuneaton and went to Alderman Smith and Manor Park Grammar School respectively)
 Jon Holmes, (born 1969) writer, comedian and broadcaster (grew up in Nuneaton)
 Conrad Keely, (born 1972) musician, born in Nuneaton
 Ken Loach, (born 1936) film and television director
 Kate Quilton (born 1983) TV presenter (Food Unwrapped – Channel 4)
 Justin Welch, (born 1972) drummer with Britpop band Elastica (1991–2001) and a drummer for Suede in their formative years
 Mary Whitehouse, (1910–2001) TV campaigner (born in Nuneaton)

Sports
 Ben Ackland, Irish cricketer (born in Nuneaton)
 Julian Alsop, footballer
 Stuart Attwell, Premier League referee
 Laura Bassett, Member of the 2015 WWC Bronze medal-winning England Women's National Football team 
 Paul Best, retired cricketer
 John Curtis, footballer
 Matty Fryatt, footballer
 Andy Goode, Wasps RFC & England International Rugby Union Player
 Wally Holmes, England international rugby union player
 Trevor Peake, footballer, 1987 FA Cup winner with Coventry City (born in Nuneaton)
 Mick Price, snooker player
 George Reader, football referee; officiated in the final game of the 1950 FIFA World Cup
 Dean Richards, former England Rugby Union player and Rugby Union Coach (born in Nuneaton)
 Nicki Shaw, a former member of the England Women's Cricket team (born in Nuneaton)
 Andy Sullivan, golfer
 Adam Whitehead, Olympic swimmer
 Peter Whittingham, footballer (born in Whitestone, Nuneaton)
 Nigel Winterburn, retired footballer
 Jake Dennis, racing driver
 Jacob Blyth, football forward for Gateshead (born in Nuneaton)

Other
 Andrew Copson, Chief Executive of Humanists UK.
 Ian Corder, UK Military Representative to NATO and Lieutenant Governor of Guernsey.
 William Dorsey (1813–1878), doctor and Australian pioneer
 Richard Freeman, cryptozoologist (born in Nuneaton)
 William Gadsby, (1773–1844) an English Baptist pastor born in Attleborough who wrote many hymns.
 Jeffrey Green, historian
 Cecil Leonard Knox, soldier, recipient of the Victoria Cross (born in Nuneaton)

Media

Radio

The local radio stations are:
BBC CWR: 104.0FM
Fosse 107 (formerly Fosseway Radio): 107.9FM
Free Radio Coventry and Warwickshire (formally known as Mercia Sound and Mercia FM): 97.0FM
Anker Radio – which serves the George Eliot Hospital, but can be heard on 1386am & 88.9FM & Online
BBC Radio Leicester can be received in the town on 104.9FM.

Written media

The main local newspapers are:
The Nuneaton Telegraph; a localised sub-edition of the Coventry Telegraph, it was launched in 1992 (when the Tribune switched from daily to weekly production).
The Nuneaton News (originally known as the Evening News upon launch and then the Heartland Evening News): Owned by Reach plc, it is a paid-for weekly newspaper, published every Wednesday.

Television news

The Nuneaton area is covered on regional TV News by:
BBC Midlands Today
ITV News Central

Twin towns
The borough of Nuneaton and Bedworth is twinned with the following towns:
 Roanne, Loire, Auvergne-Rhône-Alpes, France
 Guadalajara, Guadalajara, Castilla-La Mancha, Spain
 Cottbus, Brandenburg, Germany

References

 Nuneaton history

Bibliography

External links

Nuneaton and Bedworth borough council

 
Towns in Warwickshire
Unparished areas in Warwickshire
Former civil parishes in Warwickshire
Nuneaton and Bedworth